Christian Henry Hartje  (March 25, 1915 – June 26, 1946) was a professional baseball player, primarily in the minor leagues. Born in San Francisco, he was a catcher and played in nine games for the Brooklyn Dodgers in the major leagues in September during the 1939 baseball season.

After signing with the Spokane Indians of the Western International League in June 1946,
Hartje died less than a week later when the team's bus crashed en route to a game. At the time it was the worst accident in U.S. sports history, as nine team members were killed and six were injured. Seriously injured and badly burned, Hartje was taken to Harborview Hospital in Seattle and died the following day, the ninth fatality.

Hartje served with the U.S. Coast Guard during World War II, and was buried in the Golden Gate National Cemetery in San Bruno, California.

References

External links
 or Baseball Almanac
 Excerpt from book featuring stories of Hartje
 Article about bus crash
 

Major League Baseball catchers
Brooklyn Dodgers players
Road incident deaths in Washington (state)
1915 births
1946 deaths
Place of death missing
Baseball players from San Francisco
Wheeling Stogies players
Oakland Oaks (baseball) players
Akron Yankees players
Kansas City Blues (baseball) players
Hollywood Stars players
Montreal Royals players
Syracuse Chiefs players
Spokane Indians players
Burials at Golden Gate National Cemetery
United States Coast Guard personnel of World War II